Theta* is an any-angle path planning algorithm that is based on the A* search algorithm. It can find near-optimal paths with run times comparable to those of A*.

Description
For the simplest version of Theta*, the main loop is much the same as that of A*. The only difference is the function. Compared to A*, the parent of a node in Theta* does not have to be a neighbour of the node as long as there is a line-of-sight between the two nodes.

Pseudocode
Adapted from.function theta*(start, goal)
    // This main loop is the same as A*
    gScore(start) := 0
    parent(start) := start
    // Initializing open and closed sets. The open set is initialized 
    // with the start node and an initial cost
    open := {}
    open.insert(start, gScore(start) + heuristic(start))
    // gScore(node) is the current shortest distance from the start node to node
    // heuristic(node) is the estimated distance of node from the goal node
    // there are many options for the heuristic such as Euclidean or Manhattan 
    closed := {}
    while open is not empty
        s := open.pop()
        if s = goal
            return reconstruct_path(s)
        closed.push(s)
        for each neighbor of s
        // Loop through each immediate neighbor of s
            if neighbor not in closed
                if neighbor not in open
                    // Initialize values for neighbor if it is 
                    // not already in the open list
                    gScore(neighbor) := infinity
                    parent(neighbor) := Null
                update_vertex(s, neighbor)
    return Null
            
    
function update_vertex(s, neighbor)
    // This part of the algorithm is the main difference between A* and Theta*
    if line_of_sight(parent(s), neighbor)
        // If there is line-of-sight between parent(s) and neighbor
        // then ignore s and use the path from parent(s) to neighbor 
        if gScore(parent(s)) + c(parent(s), neighbor) < gScore(neighbor)
            // c(s, neighbor) is the Euclidean distance from s to neighbor
            gScore(neighbor) := gScore(parent(s)) + c(parent(s), neighbor)
            parent(neighbor) := parent(s)
            if neighbor in open
                open.remove(neighbor)
            open.insert(neighbor, gScore(neighbor) + heuristic(neighbor))
    else
        // If the length of the path from start to s and from s to 
        // neighbor is shorter than the shortest currently known distance
        // from start to neighbor, then update node with the new distance
        if gScore(s) + c(s, neighbor) < gScore(neighbor)
            gScore(neighbor) := gScore(s) + c(s, neighbor)
            parent(neighbor) := s
            if neighbor in open
                open.remove(neighbor)
            open.insert(neighbor, gScore(neighbor) + heuristic(neighbor))

function reconstruct_path(s)
    total_path = {s}
    // This will recursively reconstruct the path from the goal node 
    // until the start node is reached
    if parent(s) != s
        total_path.push(reconstruct_path(parent(s)))
    else
        return total_path

Variants
The following variants of the algorithm exist:

 Lazy Theta* – Node expansions are delayed, resulting in fewer line-of-sight checks
 Incremental Phi* – A modification of Theta* that allows for dynamic path planning similar to D*

See also
 Any-angle path planning
 A*

References

Graph algorithms
Routing algorithms
Search algorithms
Game artificial intelligence